Zaineb Sghaier (born 25 September 2002) is a Tunisian freestyle wrestler. She is a two-time medalist, including gold, at the African Wrestling Championships. She also represented Tunisia at the 2020 Summer Olympics in Tokyo, Japan.

Career 

She competed in the girls' freestyle 65 kg event at the 2018 Summer Youth Olympics held in Buenos Aires, Argentina. She finished in 7th place.

At the 2020 African Wrestling Championships held in Algiers, Algeria, she won the gold medal in the women's 72 kg event. She qualified at the 2021 African & Oceania Wrestling Olympic Qualification Tournament to represent Tunisia at the 2020 Summer Olympics in Tokyo, Japan. She competed in the women's freestyle 76 kg event. She lost her first match, against eventual silver medalist Adeline Gray of the United States, and she was then eliminated in the repechage by  Yasemin Adar of Turkey. Adar won one of the bronze medals in the competition.

In November 2021, she competed in the 72 kg event at the U23 World Wrestling Championships held in Belgrade, Serbia. She won the silver medal in her event at the 2022 African Wrestling Championships held in El Jadida, Morocco. A few months later, she competed in the 76 kg event at the 2022 Mediterranean Games held in Oran, Algeria. She was eliminated in her first match by eventual bronze medalist Kendra Dacher of France. She won one of the bronze medals in her event at the 2022 Tunis Ranking Series event held in Tunis, Tunisia.

Achievements

References

External links 

 

Living people
2002 births
Place of birth missing (living people)
Tunisian female sport wrestlers
Wrestlers at the 2018 Summer Youth Olympics
African Wrestling Championships medalists
Wrestlers at the 2020 Summer Olympics
Olympic wrestlers of Tunisia
Competitors at the 2022 Mediterranean Games
Mediterranean Games competitors for Tunisia
21st-century Tunisian women